Mocket was an indie art rock band formed in 1995 in Washington State.  They created several albums and EPs which were released on Up Records, K Records and Kill Rock Stars.  The band was led by multi-instrumentalist Matt Steinke.

Notes

Indie rock musical groups from Washington (state)
Musical groups from Olympia, Washington